SysML Partners is a consortium of software tool vendors and industry leaders organized in 2003 to create the Systems Modeling Language (SysML), a dialect of UML customized for systems engineering. The consortium was founded and organized by Cris Kobryn, who previously chaired the UML 1.1 and UML 2.0 specification teams, and Sandy Friedenthal, chair of the OMG Systems Engineering Special Interest Group. The SysML Partners defined SysML as an open source specification, and their specifications include an open source license for distribution and use.

The SysML Partners completed their SysML v. 1.0a specification draft and submitted it to the Object Management Group in November 2005. In recognition of their contributions to modeling, the SysML Partners were named a winner in the "Modeling Category" of the SD Times 100 for 2007.

See also
Systems Modeling Language
Unified Modeling Language
UML Partners

References

External links
SysML Open Source Specification Project Provides information related to SysML open source specifications, FAQ, mailing lists, and open source licenses.

 
Systems Modeling Language
Systems engineering